In the macOS, iOS, NeXTSTEP, and GNUstep programming frameworks, property list files are files that store serialized objects.  Property list files use the filename extension .plist, and thus are often referred to as p-list files. 

Property list files are often used to store a user's settings.  They are also used to store information about bundles and applications, a task served by the resource fork in the old Mac OS.

Property lists are also used for localization strings for development. These files use the .strings or .stringsdict extensions. The former is a "reduced" old-style plist containing only one dictionary without the braces (see ), while the latter is a fully-fledged plist. Xcode also uses a .pbxproj extension for old-style plists used as project files.

Representations 
Since the data represented by property lists is somewhat abstract, the underlying file format can be implemented many ways. Namely, NeXTSTEP used one format to represent a property list, and the subsequent GNUstep and macOS frameworks introduced differing formats.

NeXTSTEP 
Under NeXTSTEP, property lists were designed to be human-readable and edited by hand, serialized to ASCII in a syntax somewhat like a programming language. This same format was used by OPENSTEP.

 Binary data are represented as: < [hexadecimal codes in ASCII] >. Spaces and comments between paired hex-codes are ignored.
 Arrays are represented as: . Trailing commas are tolerated.
 Dictionaries are represented as: . The left-hand side must be a string, but it can be unquoted.
 As in C, whitespace are generally insignificant to syntax. Value statements terminate by a semicolon.

One limitation of the original NeXT property list format is that it could not represent an NSValue (number, boolean, etc.) object. As a result, these values would have to be converted to string, and "fuzzily" recovered by the application. Another limitation is that there is no official 8-bit encoding defined.

The defaults utility, introduced in OPENSTEP (1996), can be used to manipulate plist files used for storage of preferences (known as defaults in NeXTSTEP, hence the name) on the command line via their preferences domain, and this utility can be used to edit arbitrary plist files. This utility superseded three older commands.

GNUstep 
GNUstep adopts the NeXTSTEP format, with additions for representing NSValue and NSDate data types. The new typed entries have the form , where T is a one-letter type code. The 8-bit problem is implicitly solved as well, as most deployments use UTF-8. All in all,  brings the expressiveness and compactness of the human-readable textual format on par with Apple's XML format.

This format is defined recursively like the textual formats, with a single-byte type marker preceding some data. A form of string interning is supported via a GS-extension  switch.

Both support the binary and XML forms used by macOS to some degree, but the latter is a lot more complete. For example, the two GNUstep-specific formats are only handled in the latter.

macOS 
While macOS can also read the NeXTSTEP format, Apple sets it aside in favor of two new formats of its own, one XML-based and the other binary. Apple also has a partially-compatible JSON format.

History 
In Mac OS X 10.0, the NeXTSTEP format was deprecated, and a new XML format was introduced, with a public DTD defined by Apple.  The XML format supports non-ASCII characters and storing NSValue objects (which, unlike GNUstep's ASCII property list format, Apple's ASCII property list format does not support).

Since XML files, however, are not the most space-efficient means of storage, Mac OS X 10.2 introduced a new format where property list files are stored as binary files. Starting with Mac OS X 10.4, this is the default format for preference files. In Mac OS X 10.7, support for reading and writing files in JSON format was introduced. JSON and property lists are not fully compatible with each other, though. For example, property lists have native date and data types, which the JSON format does not support. Conversely, JSON permits null values while property lists do not support explicit nulls.

Tooling 
The old  tool from NeXTSTEP remains available. The  command provides an interactive plist editor. It can also be scripted.

The  utility (introduced in Mac OS X 10.2) can be used to check the syntax of property lists, or convert a property list file from one format to another. It also supports converting plists to Objective-C or Swift object literals. Like the Cocoa  it is built on, it takes "old-style" inputs, but does not convert to this type. (The Cocoa  from before Mac OS X 10.2 emits old-styled output.)

The  utility is introduced in Mac OS X v10.5. It takes any input and tries to generate "old-style" plists. Like the GNUstep version, it appears to use the  property of Foundation types found in plists, which Apple has specified to produce valid old-style plists.

In terms of the internals, Apple provides an open source parser for old style, XML, and binary formats in their C Core Foundation code as CFPropertyList. However, all the utilities and most parts of the system use the closed-source NSPropertyList parser from the Obj-C Foundation Kit. The Swift reimplementation is open source, but is not guaranteed to be identical.

Format 
XML and JSON property lists are hand-editable in any text editor. Additionally, Apple provides support in Xcode for editing property lists in a hierarchical viewer/editor that can handle plists formatted in binary or XML, but not JSON. As of  Mac OS X 10.4, Apple provides an AppleScript interface for reading property list files through the System Events application. As of Mac OS X 10.5, Apple provides an AppleScript interface for editing, creating and writing property list files as well.

For the XML format, the tags, related Foundation classes and CoreFoundation types, and data storage formats are as follows:

The Binary file format is documented in a comment block in the Core Foundation C code source file for Apple's open sourced implementation of binary plists in its Foundation library.  Apple describes the implementation as opaque in its plist(5) manual page documentation, which means that reliance on the format is discouraged.  In the binary file format the magic number (the first few bytes of the file which indicate that it's a valid plist file) is the text bplist, followed by two bytes indicating the version of the format.

The binary file can store some information that cannot be captured in the XML or JSON file formats.  The array, set and dictionary binary types are made up of pointers - the objref and keyref entries - that index into an object table in the file.  This means that binary plists can capture the fact that - for example - a separate array and dictionary serialized into a file both have the same data element stored in them.  This cannot be captured in an XML file.  Converting such a binary file will result in a copy of the data element being placed into the XML file.  Additionally the binary file has a UID type that is used to identify data items when serialized.  The complete list of data that can be stored taken from the C code source file is as follows:

Note the  note in many types. This means that the marker byte is only found in files with a format version no lower than the "1?" magic number. The precise way to parse them is more nebulous than the way to parse legacy types, since the CFBinaryPlist implementation only handles version "0?". In practice, these types are never encountered, since NSKeyedArchiver is already capable of capturing these information.

A table of offsets follow the object table, which is then followed by a trailer containing information on the size and location of the two tables.

Serializing to plist 
Since property lists do not capture all the information and data types required to describe an arbitrary object, an extra layer of encoding and decoding is often done. The OpenStep specification abstracts the operation of serializing any  under the  protocol. Any class implementing this protocol can have its instances serialized by a  subclass to some other format. Two main coders exist for the purpose of serializing objects to plists:
 , which converts an object into a block of binary data somewhat like a tagged struct. This class is part of OpenStep, although no concrete format has been defined. In practice, one can use it to serialize an object to a file (skipping the plist), or to embed the data in a plist. It must be read and written in the same order as written. The introduction of  deprecates its use.
The main improvement of this format for programmers is that it accesses members not by a fixed order, but by string keys. Internally, it somewhat recapitulates the binary plist format by storing an object table array called  in the dictionary. Everything else, including class information, is referenced by a UID pointer. A  entry under the dict points to the top-level object the programmer was meaning to encode.

Among other things, using an archiver allows for new datatypes to be encoded without changing the plist format itself and it is the preferred way for Apple to encode things like NSSets and null values. Parsing the formats do prove a bit harder, since one more layer must be followed even for some classes plists were supposed to support. Since there is not a UID data type in XML, the integers are stored in a dictionary under the key "CF$UID".

Apple publishes an open-source  in Swift Corelibs Foundation; like the closed-source Apple Foundation, it restricts output formats to binary and XML only. It also has some test cases showing the results of serialization. GNUstep also has a compatible implementation, which does not limit output formats.

Path language 
There is not a single, standardized path language for property lists like XPath does for XML, but informal conventions used by various programs exist.
 A dot syntax version is found in the keypath argument of Apple's .

Neither format is able to express a key with the separator character in it.

Other platforms

Windows

Although best known on Apple or Darwin systems, including iOS and macOS, plist files are also present on Windows computers when Apple software, such as iTunes or Safari are installed. On Windows, the files are typically binary files, although some applications may generate PLIST files in the other formats.

On Windows the Apple plist files are stored in the user's home directory under . These plist files on Windows typically store preferences and other information, rather than using the Windows registry.

Options for editing PLIST files on Windows are not as extensive as on macOS.  If the file is in the XML or JSON format with care a text editor such as Notepad++ can be used.  Apple ships a plutil.exe within its "Apple Application Support" package (which is part of iTunes), and it is identical to its macOS counterpart.

NetBSD

Introduced in 2006 and first released with NetBSD#4.0 (2007) is a proplib library, which can be used for serialising data between the kernel and userland. It implements part of the XML plist language.

One of the sample users of proplib is the second revision of the sysmon envsys framework for system monitoring.

NetBSD's proplib library has also been ported to DragonFly in 2010, and is available since DragonFly BSD#2.8.

Cross-platform
These cross-platform utilities are written in C++.
 The Python programming language has a builtin  module to read and write plist files, in Apple's XML or in binary (since Python 3.4). ProperTree is a cross-platform editor that makes use of this library.
 A third-party library called ccl-bplist has the additional ability to handle NSKeyedArchiver UIDs.
 Go has a  package that supports four types of plists: OpenStep text, GNUStep text, Apple XML, and Apple Binary. It also handles UIDs in XML and binary formats.

See also
 Comparison of data serialization formats

Notes

References

External links 
 The plist(5) manual page at developer.apple.com
 Excel add-in for creating plist file from Excel table
 Java API for reading/writing various plist formats - compatible with Android
 EBNF grammar of GNUstep plists

NeXT
MacOS
NetBSD
DragonFly BSD
GNUstep
Data serialization formats